Marie Adelaide Freeman-Thomas, Marchioness of Willingdon,  (née Brassey; 24 March 1875 – 30 January 1960) was a daughter of Thomas Brassey, 1st Earl Brassey. On 20 July 1892, she married Freeman Freeman-Thomas, 1st Marquess of Willingdon (12 September 1866 – 12 August 1941), the future Governor General of Canada and Viceroy of India. They had two sons, Lieutenant Gerard Frederick Freeman-Thomas (3 May 1893 – 14 September 1914), killed, aged 21, in the First World War, and Inigo Brassey Freeman-Thomas, 2nd Marquess of Willingdon (25 July 1899 – 19 March 1979).

Honours
She was:
 Invested as an Imperial Order of the Crown of India (C.I.) in 1917
 Decorated with the Kaisar-i-Hind Gold Medal
 Invested as a Dame of Justice, Venerable Order of Saint John (D.J.St. J.)
 Decorated with the Order of Mercy.
 Invested as a Dame Commander of the Order of the British Empire (DBE) in December 1917
 Invested as a Dame Grand Cross of the Order of the British Empire (GBE) in the 1924 Birthday Honours

Legacy
Marie Canyon on the Cowichan River, Vancouver Island, is named for her, commemorating a 1930 canoe trip from Cowichan Lake down that river to the city of Duncan, British Columbia.
 The Lady Willingdon Hospital in Lahore, Pakistan, is named after her
 The Lady Willingdon Hospital in Manali, Himachal Pradesh, India, is named after her. www.manalihospital.com

References

1875 births
1960 deaths
British marchionesses
Canadian viceregal consorts
Viceregal consorts of India
Companions of the Order of the Crown of India
Dames Grand Cross of the Order of the British Empire
Dames of Justice of the Order of St John
Daughters of British earls
Recipients of the Kaisar-i-Hind Medal
Brassey family
Place of birth missing
Wives of knights